Coombe is a village in Kea parish in Cornwall, England, United Kingdom.

Coombe lies within the Cornwall Area of Outstanding Natural Beauty (AONB).

References

External links

Villages in Cornwall